Jherian Wali (also known as Jherianwali and Bishanpura) is a village in Sardulgarh tehsil of Mansa district in Punjab, India.

Geography 

Beere Wala Jattan, Baje Wala, Chhapian Wali, Nangla, Burj Bhalaike, Mian, Raipur and Tandian are the surrounding villages.

History 
The name Jherian Wali is driven a pond in the area. The other name of the village, Bishanpura, is after Bishan Singh, an ancestor of the village.

Culture 

Punjabi is the mother tongue as well as the official language of the village.

Religion 

The village is predominated by Sikhs, the followers of Sikhism with other minorities. The Sikhs worships in the Gurudwara and Hindus have a Balmik Mandir.

Education and economy

Education

The village has a government middle school which upgraded to high in 2010 and a new building was built. To provide children pure drinking water, the school has a Reverse osmosis plant.

Economy

Agriculture is the main source of income for all Jat people of the village while the poor do labour.

References 

Villages in Mansa district, India
Villages surrounding Talwandi Sabo Power Plant